Eremophila canaliculata is a flowering plant in the figwort family, Scrophulariaceae and is endemic to an area near Newman in the Pilbara region of Western Australia. It is a low, compact and highly aromatic shrub with serrated leaves and mauve to blue flowers.

Description
The leaves are arranged alternately and crowded near the ends of the branches.

The flowers are borne in groups of up to 3 in leaf axils and lack a stalk. The tube is white to lilac or blue, densely hairy on the outside and the 4 stamens do not extend beyond the petal tube.

Taxonomy and naming
Eremophila canaliculata was first formally described by Robert Chinnock in 2007 and the description was published in Eremophila and Allied Genera: A Monograph of the Plant Family Myoporaceae. The specific epithet (canaliculata) is a Latin word meaning "channelled' or "grooved".

Distribution and habitat
This eremophila occurs between Newman and the Kennedy Range in the Gascoyne and Pilbara biogeographic regions where it grows in sandy soils and on stony flats and rocky hillsides.

Conservation status
Eremophila canaliculata is classified as "not threatened" by the Western Australian Government Department of Parks and Wildlife.

Use in horticulture
This eremophila has not been in cultivation for a long time, and its requirements are not well known but probably requires a well-drained soil. It has been successfully propagated by grafting onto Myoporum species. Its natural environment suggests it needs summer watering, and it is known to be frost sensitive.

References

canaliculata
Eudicots of Western Australia
Plants described in 2007
Endemic flora of Western Australia